Theodoor Jacob "Theo" van Leeuwen (born 1947) is a Dutch linguist and one of the main developers of the sub-field of social semiotics. He is also known for his contributions to the study of Multimodality; he wrote with Gunther Kress Reading Images: The Grammar of Visual Design, one of the most influential books on the topic.

Career
Van Leeuwen obtained a BA in scriptwriting and direction from the Netherlands Film Academy in Amsterdam in 1972. He married an Australian and moved to Australia later in the 1970s. Van Leeuwen worked as a director, script writer, and producer for film and television in both Holland and Australia. Van Leeuwen has also been noted as a former jazz pianist. In 1982, he finished a master's degree at Macquarie University in Sydney with a thesis on intonation. In 1992, he finished his PhD in linguistics at University of Sydney with a thesis on uniting linguistics and social theory. Van Leeuwen has taught communication theory at Macquarie University and the London College of Printing, and has taught courses at universities in Amsterdam, Vancouver, Vienna, Madrid, Stockholm, Copenhagen and Auckland. He was the dean of the Faculty of Humanities and Social Sciences at the University of Technology, Sydney until 2013, when he took a position at the University of Southern Denmark.

Selected bibliography
 Kress, Gunther R., & van Leeuwen, Theo (1996). Reading Images: The Grammar of Visual Design. New York: Routledge. .
 Speech, Music, Sound. (1999) London: Macmillan. 
 Introducing Social Semiotics (2005) London & New York: Routledge 
 Discourse and Practice: New Tools for Critical Discourse Analysis (2008) Oxford University Press 
 The Language of Colour: An Introduction (2011) London & New York: Routledge

References

1947 births
Living people
Communication theorists
Linguists from the Netherlands
Macquarie University alumni
University of Sydney alumni
Academics of Cardiff University
Academics of Lancaster University
Academic staff of Macquarie University
Academic staff of the University of Sydney
Academic staff of the University of Southern Denmark
Dutch expatriates in Australia
Dutch expatriates in Denmark
Department of Linguistics and English Language, Lancaster University